Meray Paas Tum Ho is a 2019 Pakistani romantic drama television series produced by Humayun Saeed and Shahzad Nasib under their production banner Six Sigma Plus. Directed by Nadeem Baig and written by Khalil-ur-Rehman Qamar, the show starred Humayun Saeed, Ayeza Khan and Adnan Siddiqui. The show aired on ARY Digital from 17 August 2019 to 25 January 2020. It is digitally available on YouTube and ARY Zap App.

Plot

Summary 
Danish is a simple man with moral values of idealized Pakistani culture. He works as a government officer. His whole world revolves around his wife Mehwish and son Roomi (the new childstar). Subsequently, his wife Mehwish gets in extramarital relation with a businessman Shehwar Ahmad getting under influence of his flattery and attraction of his wealth. He even offers Mehwish a high position job in his office with a very high salary and added perks but Mehwish's son and husband disapprove of her job in his office as they suspect the extra marital relationship.

After sometime, Mehwish leaves her husband and son and starts a new life with Shehwar. After almost six or seven months of a live-in relationship with Shehwar, she convinces him to marry her but on the day of their wedding, Shehwar's first wife Maham arrives back to Pakistan. She is the sole owner of the wealth that Shehwar has. When she realizes that Shehwar was going to marry Mehwish, she slaps Mehwish tightly across the face and asks her to leave her house immediately. Subsequently, Shehwar Ahmad loses both his wealth and respect because of Maham who put him in jail hence he abandons Mehwish.

When Mehwish visits him in jail he refuses to even acknowledge her and asks her to go away from his life and blames her that she is the reason his wife put him in jail. Mehwish has nowhere to go now and on the other side Danish sold his old flat and invested the money in the stock market and became rich over the course of these months.

During the course of these months Danish develops a friendly relationship with Roomi's teacher – Hania but she develops real feelings for Danish. She even proposes him as she fell in love with him but Danish does not reciprocate her feelings. Mehwish on the other hand contacts Danish's business partner- Salman for help. He is also a mutual friend of theirs from college. Through him she asks for Danish's forgiveness repeatedly and requests to meet him once. Danish sends her a message through Salman that he has forgiven her but he does not want to meet her. She even attempts suicide but Danish doesn't show any affection neither turns up to meet her at the hospital. Shehwar Ahmed's jail term is broadly diffused by the media.

After being prodded by Roomi and Salman, Danish agrees on meeting Mehwish once. When he meets her, he suffers a major heart attack due to facing her and all the grief of disloyalty that she gave him. He passes away in the hospital. Even Maham forgives Shehwar and brings him home but demotes his post in the office from the CEO to a minor executive. This doesn't go well with Shehwar and he realizes all of his mistakes and leaves from Maham's home and life forever.

Cast

Main
Humayun Saeed as Danish
Ayeza Khan as Mehwish 
Adnan Siddiqui as Shehwaar Ahmed
Hira salman as Hania

Recurring
Hira Mani as Hania; Roomi's teacher
Shees Sajjad Gul as Roomi; Danish's son
Mehar Bano as Anushey; Mehwish's friend
Hina Javed as Wateera; Hania's sister
Mohammad Ahmed as Mateen; Danish's colleague, Hania's father
Furqan Qureshi as Salman; Danish's friend
Rehmat Ajmal as Aisha; Danish and Mehwish's friend, Salman's wife
Musaddiq Malik as Monty; Danish and Mehwish's neighbour

Guest appearances
Savera Nadeem as Maham Sayed
Shamim Hilaly as Roomi's school principal
Anoushay Abbasi as Ifra; Monty's wife
Waseem Lashari as Anti-corruption officer

Episodes

Reception
The show became one of the most popular serial of 2019 after airing its first episode in Pakistan. The show received best ever TV ratings becoming the best ever ranked drama in the history of Pakistan. Last episode of the drama was viewed by almost more than 79.6 million people in Pakistan.

The Performances and Chemistry of Saeed and Khan were praised by critics. Alysha Khan of HipInPakistan wrote, "Saeed absolutely killed it with a Good Boy Avatar, and he shares great on-screen chemistry with Khan and also praised Khan's performance". Sarah Shaukat of Entertainment Pakistan wrote, "Saeed stole the show with towering performance in every scene he managed to impress with his attitude and dialogue delivery while Khan was consistent and looked really good". Laiba Sabeen of OyeYeah wrote, "The Superb Performances of Saeed, Khan, Siddiqui, and Baig's brilliant direction keeps the viewers engaged in a crisp story". Maliha Rehman of DAWN wrote, "Humayun Saeed at his very best, making his audience cry with him. Beautiful dialogues by Khalil-ur-Rehman and Nadeem Baig directing with such sensitivity".

Feminist view 
The TV drama serial was received in Pakistan's feminist circles with skepticism & reservation. Specially the script writer got criticized for his misogynist views. Author Aisha Sarwari says drama convinces audience that it is okay to slur at and slut shame materialistic women, and this double standard is morally questionable since Pakistani society in general & bridegrooms in particular are known for dowry seeking and can not claim high moral ground vis a vis materialistic women. While actually Pakistan is known for acid attacks, domestic violence, serious levels of honor killings of women even at suggestion of freedom of choice. Sarwari says sadly depiction is falsified far from real life and one won't find even in 1000 km of South Asia any very positive, patient and giving protagonist as depicted in the drama. Sarwari believes that this kind of content trends in Pakistan since there is lack of actual better actual life characters than this in Pakistan society.

Afiya S. Zia not only criticizes the author for his sexist views but also criticizes content of family drama scripts dished out by Pakistani Television channels since last 20 years as advice literature of digest authors as writing such content which rather than questioning, normalizes & internalizes injustices to women in Pakistan in garb of piety, modesty, and religious agency preaching lessons to women to submit themselves and continue to remain subservient to a male dominated patriarchy of Pakistan. Afiya S. Zia says the TV series presentation creates a false narrative that Pakistani patriarchal family structure do take care of all family members equally, practically which is far from the truth rather Pakistani women are meted out with discrimination and violent backlash for demanding their sexual freedoms.

Khalil-ur-Rehman Qamar entered into altercations with Pakistani feminist Marvi Sirmed over slogans in Aurat March on International Women's Day including Mera Jism Meri Marzi during a television debate in March 2020.

Quite a few placards in Aurat March on International Women's Day 2020 were critical of misogyny & sexism of the author Khalil-ur-Rehman Qamar expressed through his participation in reality TV shows & drama both.

Controversies over dialogues and statements 
Some of the dialogues in the TV serial and some of the later statements of Khalil-ur-Rehman Qamar invited debate controversies from liberal and feminists in social media and mainstream media both.

One of the TV serial dialogue refers to a character in the serial as "do take ki larki (second rate / worthless woman)" became famous among misogynists of Pakistan and severely criticized by feminists. Feminist Tahira Abdullah called out the wording judgmental, 'It's not for any one to judge a woman good or bad based on woman's loyalty; respect and dignity is woman's right not dependent on anyone else's willingness. Just by being a woman she deserves to be treated human born equal to not beg but claim equal rights. Women do not need men to define standards of behavior for women and categorize who is good or bad woman", referring to the famous utterance of Qamar that women by definition are modest & loyal and those who are not modest and loyal do not deserve to be called women at all. In the same debate, Qamar called himself to be "the biggest feminist". Pakistani actress Iffat Omar pointing out that the last episode of the serial poses questions over the double-standard Qamar-presented Pakistani conservative narrative that a Pakistani woman is expected and idealized for forgiving a husband's disloyalty as Maham, the wife of Shehwar Ahmad, who was involved in an extra-marital relationship, forgives him. On the other hand, lead protagonist Danish is shown to not be able to bear the extra-marital relation of his wife Mehwish but rather prefers death as sign of non-forgiving. Pakistani males' non-acceptance of spousal choices and at the same time, entitled Pakistani males expect forgiveness for their own behavior.

In other debates Khalil-ur-Rahman Qamar also made other controversial statements like: "women should gang rape men if they want equality."; "Aurat March is a conspiracy of some 35 women who belong to a specific class." Pakistani actress Iffat Omar responded back saying women do not ask equality to rape men but to redress patriarchal double standards & injustices towards fellow women.

Later, some actors of the serial preferred to distance themselves from ensuing controversies. Actress Rehmat Ajmal accepted that she stumbled a little since she was not aware enough about how the TV serial will come out on the screen, and that she necessarily does not endorse controversial views expressed by the writer Qamar. Actor Adnan Siddiqui  said that he understands the dialogues had problematic leanings and he wished drama could have been more nuanced in depiction of women.

Production
In an interview with Dawn Images Ayeza Khan confirmed that she's starring in a drama serial Mere Paas Tum Ho, with Humayun Saeed. In an interview Khalil-Ur-Rehman Qamar said that Sonya Hussyn, Sanam Jung and Ayeza Khan was offered for the role of Mehwish. Likewise, the role of Danish was previously offered to Feroze Khan who refused after a falling out with the writer Khalil-Ur-Rehman Qamar. A Nadeem Baig's directional, written by Khalil-Ur-Rehman Qamar and Produced by Humayun Saeed and Shahzad Nasib the duo previously worked together in 2017 Blockbuster film Punjab Nahi Jaungi. On 22 November 2018 shooting started and On 17 July 2019 the shooting wrapped. On being asked why he choose this drama Saeed said that "this script was great and it was witref>h him for 3 years but he was focusing on his films so Nadeem decided to cast someone else. But Khalil became angry because he wanted Saeed to play the lead role in this drama So Saeed agreed to do this Drama Serial". On 31 July 2019 The first look and teaser was released.
The second teaser was released on 3 August 2019.

Adaptations

Ratings 

  
Meray Paas Tum Ho became the first Pakistani drama to trend no 1 on twitter worldwide. It started off very well, the first episode gained 10.9 TRPs which were the highest  first episode ratings at that time (this record was later broken by Ehd-e-Wafa which garnered 11 trps in its 1st episode). Episode 23 which was the last episode of the serial got 37.1 TRPs, which is the highest ratings of any TV program of Pakistan. Episode 22 got 26.2 TRPs, which is the 2nd highest ratings of any TV program of Pakistan, while, Episode 17 got 24.9 TRPs, which is the 3rd highest ratings of any TV program of Pakistan. Episode 20 got 24.0 TRPs, which is the 4th highest ratings of any TV program of Pakistan.

The final episode was a 'mega double episode' and aired on 25 January 2020 and was simultaneously shown on TV as well as being screened in major cinemas across Pakistan (in Karachi, Lahore and Islamabad). The cast were present at Nueplex Cinema in Karachi for the finale.

Soundtrack

The title song was sung by Rahat Fateh Ali Khan. The music was composed by Naveed Nashad and the lyrics were written by Khalil-ur-Rehman Qamar.

Awards and nominations

See also 

 Divorce in Pakistan

References

External links

2019 Pakistani television series debuts
Pakistani drama television series